Mohit Marwah is an Indian actor who works in Bollywood films. He is best known for his debut feature film Fugly (2014), and Raag Desh (2017). He has also appeared in short films such as Strangers in the Night produced by Dharma Productions and directed by Shakun Batra, and in Love Shots produced by Yash Raj Films.

Early life and background
Mohit Marwah is the elder son of Sandeep Marwah, founder of Noida Film City, and his wife Reena Marwah. Marwah has one younger brother named Akshay Marwah. His mother, Reena Marwah, is the daughter of Surinder Kapoor and sister of film personalities Boney Kapoor, Anil Kapoor and Sanjay Kapoor. He is a first cousin of Sonam Kapoor, Arjun Kapoor, Harshvardhan Kapoor, Rhea Kapoor, and Jahnvi Kapoor.

In February 2018 in Al Jazirah Al Hamra, Marwah married Antara Motiwala, niece of former actress Tina Munim (wife of industrialist Anil Ambani).

Mohit Marwah attended Don Bosco School and University of Delhi for his formal education. He joined Asian Academy of Film & Television following his inclination towards filmmaking. Thereafter, Mohit Marwah was accepted by Vikram Bhatt as his assistant director. After gathering field experience in movie production, Mohit Marwah decided to specialise in acting and proceed to New York City to join the Lee Strasberg Acting School.

Career

Mohit Marwah started out his career working as an assistant director to Vikram Bhatt, getting involved in activities of the production process of three films, namely Elaan (2005), Jurm (2005) and Deewane Huye Pagal (2005).

He acted in a short film The Audition, produced by his sibling Akshay Marwah, directed by Karan Boolani and music supervised by Amit Trivedi. He also did a short film produced by Karan Johar called Strangers in the Night presented by Dharma Productions and directed by Shakun Batra.

Thereafter, he got his break into the mainstream when he was signed by Akshay Kumar for the feature film Fugly opposite Kiara Advani.

He acted in a video featuring Anmoll Mallik, singer and music director Anu Malik's daughter's debut single, "Lamhein" - a recreation of Coldplay's 2011 hit, "Paradise".

Mohit starred in a short film by Y-Films, the youth division of Yash Raj Films, Love Shots - a collection of six short films, starring him along with Farida Jalal, Kulbhushan Kharbanda, Nimrat Kaur, Shweta Tripathi, Tillotama Shome, Saqib Saleem, Tahir Raj Bhasin, Rhea Chakraborty, Saba Azad, Salim Merchant and Swanand Kirkire. He has also acted in the short film The Big Date and later appeared in Raag Desh.

Off-screen appearances and work 

He is the director of Marwah Studios group, a creative enterprise involved in Media and entertainment activities. In 2014, Mohit was named one of the Best Dressed Men in Bollywood by GQ India. He has also featured in GQ India’s spring spread showcasing standout collection from the Italian fashion label Gucci. Marwah has appeared on the ramp for famous fashion designer Tarun Tahiliani in New Delhi to mark his support for a social cause. The show was organized for raising awareness in communities to help autistic children. He was also signed as the brand ambassador for the famous lifestyle brand, Provogue.

Filmography 
Films

Short films, web series and music videos

References

External links
 

Delhi University alumni
Living people
Male actors from New Delhi
Don Bosco schools alumni
Year of birth missing (living people)
Indian male film actors
21st-century Indian male actors